Kymco (an acronym for Kwang Yang Motor Co, Ltd) (stylized as KYMCO) is a Taiwanese motorcycle manufacturer headquartered in Kaohsiung, Taiwan. With approximately 3000 employees, Kymco produces over 570,000 vehicles annually at its factory in Kaohsiung. The company also has production facilities in Indonesia, Malaysia, and PR China.

History
The company was founded in 1963 after splitting from Honda. KYMCO originally made parts for Honda. The company built its first complete scooter in 1970 and began marketing under the "KYMCO" brand name in 1992. In the 2000s, Kymco became the largest scooter manufacturer in Taiwan, and the fifth largest scooter manufacturer worldwide. In early 2008, KYMCO was chosen by BMW to supply the engines for their G450 X Enduro bike. The optional range extender in the BMW i3 is also supplied by Kymco. In late 2013, Kawasaki announced that their new J300 scooter is manufactured in partnership with Kymco. It is based on a Kymco Downtown 300i.

Products

Scooters

 150XLS
 Activ 50/125
 Agility 50/125
 Agility City A/C 125/150/200
 Agility 16+ 300I
 KB 50
 CV 3 550i
 AK550
 Bet & Win 50/125/150/250 (also known as Ego)
 Caro 100
 Cherry 50/100
 Cobra Cross 50
 Cobra Racer 50/100
 Compagno 110i 
 Dink 50 A/C
 Dink L/C
 Dink/Yager 125
 Dink 150/200
 DJ 50 S
 Downtown 125i/200i/250i/300i/350i
 Nikita 300/125 (known as Downtown in the U.S., Canada and Europe) 
 Easy 100 (also known as Free LX 100/110)
 Ego 125
 Espresso 150
 Famous 110
 Filly 50LX
 G3
 Grand Dink (known as Grand Vista in the U.S. and the Frost in Canada) 125/150/250
 Heroism 125/150-豪邁
 Jockey 125
 Like 50/125/200i/200i XL/125 EV
 Miler 125
 Movie 50
 Movie XL 125/150
 MyRoad 700i
 New Sento 110cc
 People 50
 People S 50
 People 125
 People S 125
 People 150
 People S 200
 People S 200 i
 People 250
 People S 250
 People S 250i
 People S 300i >2008
 People GT 200i/300i
 People One 125i
 Sento 50
 Sento 100
 Sooner 100
 Super 8 125/150
 Super 9
 Top Boy 50 On/Off Road
 V-Link
 Vitality 50 (2 stroke and 4 stroke models)
 Vivio 125
 VJR 125
 Xciting 250/300/300 Ri/400I/500/500 Ri
 X-Town 300i
 Yager 125
 Yager GT 125
 Yager GT 200i
 Yup 50/250
 ZX 50

Motorcycles

 Activ 110/125
 Axr 110
 Cruiser 125
 CK1 125 
 Grand King 125/150
 Hipster 125 2V
 Hipster 125 4V (H/Bar and L/Bar)
 Hipster 150
 Jetix 50/125
 KTR/KCR 125/150
 K-Pipe 50/125
 Pulsar/CK 125
 Pulsar Luxe 125
 Pulsar S 125
 Quannon (known as KR Sport in the U.S.)
 Kymco Quannon 125/150/150 Fi
 Kymco Quannon Naked 125
 Spade 150
Spike 125
 Stryker 750 (on- and off-road)
 Stryker 550 (on- and off-road)
 Visa R110
 VSR 125i
 Venox 250
 Venox 1000i
 Zing 125/150

ATVs

 KXR 50/90
 KXR 250 (on-road)
 Maxxer 300 450i
 Mongoose KXR250
 MXer 50
 MXer 125
 MXer 125 (on-road)
 MXer 150
 MXer 150 (on-road)
 MXU 50/150/250/300/400/500/500i IRS
 MXU 450i/550i/700i
 UXV 450i/500i/700i

Kymco in the United States
Kymco has its U.S. subsidiary KYMCO USA headquartered in Spartanburg, South Carolina, United States and sells its vehicles and products via 600 franchised dealerships located throughout the country. For the U.S. market, Kymco offers 10 scooters, eight side by sides, 14 ATVs and two small displacement motorcycles in its line of products. Kymco was the official Scooter and ATV for the NHRA and with Gray Motorsports primary sponsor of the 2014 NHRA Mello Yello Drag Racing Series.

See also
 SYM Motors
 List of companies of Taiwan
 List of Taiwanese automakers
 Automotive industry in Taiwan

References

External links

1963 establishments in Taiwan
Manufacturing companies based in Kaohsiung
Companies listed on the Taiwan Stock Exchange
Multinational companies headquartered in Taiwan
Scooter manufacturers
Motorcycle manufacturers of Taiwan
Taiwanese brands
Companies based in Spartanburg, South Carolina